This is a list of schools in Reading in the English county of Berkshire.

State-funded schools

Primary schools

Alfred Sutton Primary School
All Saints CE Infant School
All Saints Junior School
Battle Primary Academy
Caversham Park Primary School
Caversham Primary School
Christ the King RC Primary School
Churchend Primary Academy
Civitas Academy
Coley Primary School
EP Collier Primary School
Emmer Green Primary School
English Martyrs' RC Primary School
Geoffrey Field Infant School
Geoffrey Field Junior School
Green Park Village Primary Academy
The Heights Primary School
The Hill Primary School
Katesgrove Primary School
Manor Primary School
Meadow Park Academy
Micklands Primary School
Moorlands Primary School
New Christ Church CE Primary School
New Town Primary School
Oxford Road Community School
The Palmer Primary Academy
Park Lane Primary School
Ranikhet Academy
Redlands Primary School
The Ridgeway Primary School
St Anne's RC Primary School
St John's CE Primary School
St Martin's RC Primary School
St Mary and All Saints CE Primary School
St Michael's Primary School
Southcote Primary School
Thameside Primary School
Whitley Park Primary School
Wilson Primary School

Non-selective secondary schools

Blessed Hugh Faringdon Catholic School
Highdown School
John Madejski Academy
King's Academy Prospect
Little Heath School*
Maiden Erlegh School in Reading
Reading Girls' School
UTC Reading
The Wren School

*This school is located in West Berkshire but also admits pupils from Reading

Grammar schools
Kendrick School
Reading Girls' School
Reading School

Special and alternative schools
The Avenue Special School
Cranbury College
Hamilton School
The Holy Brook School
Thames Valley School

Further education
Reading College

Independent schools

Primary and preparatory schools
Caversham Preparatory School
Hemdean House School
St Edward's Prep
Trinity Christian School

Senior and all-through schools
The Abbey School
The Deenway Montessori School
Leighton Park School
OneSchool Global UK
Queen Anne's School
St Joseph's College

Special and alternative schools
The Red Balloon Learner Centre

External links

Reading
Schools in Reading, Berkshire
School